The Devil and Daniel Johnston is a 2005 documentary film about American musician Daniel Johnston. It chronicles Johnston's life from childhood up to the present, with an emphasis on his experiences with bipolar disorder, and how it manifested itself in demonic self-obsession. The film was directed by Jeff Feuerzeig and produced by Henry S. Rosenthal.

Reception

Critical reception 
On Rotten Tomatoes the film has an approval rating of 89% based on 110 reviews.
On Metacritic the film has a score of 77 out of 100, based on reviews from 33 critics.

Awards 

The film won the Documentary Directing Award at the 2005 Sundance Film Festival.

Home media 

It is available on DVD from Sony Pictures Home Entertainment, which includes a supplemental feature documenting the reunion between Johnston and his long-time obsession and muse, Laurie Allen. A manufacture on demand Blu-ray was released through Sony's Choice Collection on October 19, 2016.

References

External links 
 
 
 

Daniel Johnston
2005 films
2005 documentary films
American documentary films
Sundance Film Festival award winners
Documentary films about rock music and musicians
Sony Pictures Classics films
Documentary films about mental disorders
Films shot in New York City
Films shot in West Virginia
Outsider music
2000s English-language films
2000s American films